Verechelen (Chuvash: Вӗрӗҫӗлен or Вӗриҫӗлен, Вӗриҫлен, Вриҫлен, Russian: Вереселень) also known as Chuvash dragons which are winged fire-breathing and shape shifting dragons. The legend originates with the ancestral people of the Chuvashians.

The name means 'invisible snake'. These differ from their Turkic counterparts (such as Zilant), as they are supposed to reflect the pre-Islamic mythology of Volga Bulgaria.

Varieties 
Chuvash dragon is Věri Şělen (Вӗри Ҫӗлен, lit. "fire snake"). Like the Russian Gorynych, the creature has multiple heads and leaves a fiery wake when flying. The wood demon Arşuri (Арçури; Russian: Арзюри; Turkish: Arçura) often turns into a snake, but more often he looks like Şüräle. The Iranian dragon, Ajdaha (Аçтаха), is also mentioned from time to time, probably due to Iranian influence to Volga Bulgaria.

Legends

According to one legend, when the Bulgars came to found the town of Bilär, they discovered a big snake living in the area. When they decided to kill it, the snake begged for peace and asked Allah to give him wings. Once he got wings, the snake flew away from Bilär.

Another great snake, or dragon, was said to live in a pagan tower temple at Alabuğa. Although the Bulgars adopted Islam as early as the tenth century, the snake allegedly survived until the time of Tamerlane's invasion.

Ibn Fadlan, who visited Volga Bulgaria in the 10th century, referred to numerous snakes, especially on trees. Once he saw a big fallen tree, which was longer than a hundred ells. Ibn Fadlan wrote that he'd seen a big snake at the trunk that had been almost as large as the tree itself. The Bulgars allayed his fears, assuring him that the snake was not dangerous.

See also 

 List of dragons in mythology and folklore

References

 Чӑваш халӑх пултарулӑхӗ: Мифсем, легендӑсем, халапсем. — Шупашкар: Чӑваш кӗнеке изд-ви, 2004. 

Turkic legendary creatures
Chuvash folklore
European dragons
Shapeshifting
Culture of Chuvashia